The 2006 Meath Senior Football Championship was the 114th edition of the Meath GAA's premier club Gaelic football tournament for senior graded teams in County Meath, Ireland. The tournament consists of 16 teams, with the winner going on to represent Meath in the Leinster Senior Club Football Championship. The championship starts with a group stage and then progresses to a knock out stage.
 
St. Peter's Dunboyne were the defending champions after they defeated Navan O'Mahonys in the previous years final.

Duleek were promoted after claiming the 2005 Meath Intermediate Football Championship title, their first Intermediate win since 1978.

On 15 October 2006, Wolfe Tones claimed their 1st Senior Championship title when they defeated Navan O'Mahonys 1-9 to 1-7. Darren McGrath lifted the Tones first ever Keegan Cup while Cian Ward claimed the 'Man of the Match' award.

Cortown were relegated after 10 years in the senior grade.

The group match between Seneschalstown and Cortown at Simonstown on 8 September 2006 was the first ever Meath Senior Football Championship match to be played under lights.

Team changes
The following teams have changed division since the 2005 championship season.

To S.F.C.
Promoted from I.F.C.
 Duleek  -  (Intermediate Champions)

From S.F.C.
Relegated to I.F.C.
 Dunderry

Group stage
There are 2 groups called Group A and B. The 4 top finishers in Group A and B will qualify for the quarter finals. The 2 teams that finish last in their groups will play in a relegation play off.

Group A

Round 1:
 Kilmainhamwood 2-7, 1-10 Dunshaughlin, Simonstown,
 Navan O'Mahonys 1-11, 1-9 St. Patrick's, Ratoath,
 Blackhall Gaels 0-14, 2-8 Duleek, Skryne,
 Simonstown Gaels 1-8, 0-10 Summerhill, Pairc Tailteann,

Round 2:
 Navan O'Mahonys 2-11, 0-4 Kilmainhamwood, Kells,
 Blackhall Gaels 0-13, 0-11 Summerhill, Dunsany,
 St. Patrick's 2-9, 1-11 Duleek, Bellewstown,
 Simonstown Gaels 1-10, 0-12 Dunshaughlin, Pairc Tailteann,

Round 3:
 Navan O'Mahonys 0-13, 0-12 Dunshaughlin, Pairc Tailteann, 
 St. Patrick's 0-6, 0-6 Summerhill, Dunshaughlin,
 Duleek 1-12, 0-7 Kilmainhamwood, Kilberry,
 Blackhall Gaels 2-10, 1-13 Simonstown Gaels, Pairc Tailteann,

Round 4:
 Navan O'Mahonys 0-8, 0-6 Simonstown Gaels, Pairc Tailteann,
 Kilmainhamwood 0-11, 0-9 Summerhill, Bohermeen,
 Dunshaughlin 0-12, 1-9 Duleek, Pairc Tailteann,
 Blackhall Gaels 2-11, 2-8 St. Patrick's, Walterstown
 
Round 5:
 Navan O'Mahonys 0-15, 1-9 Duleek, Pairc Tailteann,
 Dunshaughlin 1-8, 0-11 Summerhill, Dunsany,
 St. Patrick's 2-14, 0-9 Simonstown Gaels, Skryne,
 Blackhall Gaels 1-11, 2-4 Kilmainhamwood, Simonstown,

Round 6:
 Navan O'Mahonys 3-6, 3-6 Summerhill, Trim,
 Duleek 0-10, 0-9 Simonstown Gaels, Skryne,
 St. Patrick's 5-20, 1-6 Kilmainhamwood, Seneschalstown,
 Dunshaughlin 1-8, 0-11 Summerhill, Dunsany,

Round 7:
 Blackhall Gaels 0-8, 0-7 Navan O'Mahonys, Trim,
 Summerhill 1-13, 1-9 Duleek, Pairc Tailteann,
 Simonstown Gaels 1-15, 0-5 Kilmainhamwood, Kells,
 St. Patrick's 2-13, 0-9 Dunshaughlin, Walterstown,

Group B

Round 1:
 Wolfe Tones 0-13, 0-7 Cortown, Moynalty,
 St. Peter's Dunboyne 4-10, 2-12 Walterstown, Dunsany,
 Ballinlough 2-9, 2-7 Skryne, Trim,
 Trim 0-11, 0-10 Seneschalstown, Pairc Tailteann,

Round 2:
 Trim 2-14, 0-4 Cortown, Athboy,
 Walterstown 0-14, 0-12 Seneschalstown, Pairc Tailteann,
 Wolfe Tones 1-11, 2-7 Skryne, Pairc Tailteann,
 St. Peter's Dunboyne 3-19, 0-4 Ballinlough, Simonstown,

Round 3:
 Skryne 2-9, 0-9 Cortown, Simonstown,
 Walterstown 3-8, 0-13 Trim, Pairc Tailteann,
 Seneschalstown 2-17, 1-8 Ballinlough, Bohermeen,
 Wolfe Tones 1-10, 0-9 St. Peter's Dunboyne, Walterstown,

Round 4:
 Walterstown 2-12, 0-6 Cortown, Simonstown,
 Skryne 1-13, 0-14 St. Peter's Dunboyne, Pairc Tailteann,
 Wolfe Tones 1-16, 0-11 Seneschalstown, Pairc Tailteann,
 Trim 0-19, 0-5 Ballinlough, Athboy,

Round 5:
 St. Peter's Dunboyne 1-16, 0-6 Cortown,
 Walterstown 1-14, 1-2 Ballinlough, Bohermeen,
 Skryne 1-9, 1-7 Seneschalstown, Walterstown,
 Wolfe Tones 2-6, 2-6 Trim, Bohermeen,

Round 6:
 Ballinlough 2-8, 0-10 Cortown,
 Walterstown 1-11, 0-13 Wolfe Tones, Pairc Tailteann,
 Trim 0-11, 0-6 Skryne, Pairc Tailteann,
 Seneschalstown 0-17, 0-8 St. Peter's Dunboyne, Dunsany,

Round 7:
 Seneschalstown 1-11, 1-9 Cortown, Simonstown,
 Walterstown 1-10, 0-10 Skryne, Pairc Tailteann,
 St. Peter's Dunboyne 0-11, 0-8 Trim, Pairc Tailteann,
 Wolfe Tones 4-15, 0-13 Ballinlough, Bohermeen,

Knock-out stage

Relegation play off
Kilmainhamwood 0-13, 0-11 Cortown, Moynalty, 6/10/2006,

Finals

Quarter-final
 Simonstown Gaels 1-11, 0-11 Walterstown, Pairc Tailteann, AET 23/9/2006,
 Wolfe Tones 2-6, 0-7 St. Patrick's, Pairc Tailteann, 23/9/2006,
 Navan O'Mahonys 2-13, 0-10 Trim, Pairc Tailteann, 24/9/2006,
 Blackhall Gaels 1-9, 0-11 St. Peter's Dunboyne, Pairc Tailteann, 24/9/2006,

Semi-final
 Wolfe Tones 1-11, 0-10 Simonstown Gaels, Pairc Tailteann, 1/10/2006,
 Navan O'Mahonys 2-12, 2-10 Blackhall Gaels, Pairc Tailteann, 1/10/2006,

Final:
 Wolfe Tones 1-9, 1-7 Navan O'Mahony's, Pairc Tailteann, 15/10/2006,

References

External links

Meath Senior Football Championship
Meath Senior Football Championship